Promised Land is a CBC Radio One program about refugees to Canada that first ran in the summer of 2010. It was presented by Natasha Fatah.

Format 
Promised Land features interviews with refugees to Canada who have gone through, in the words of the show's presenter Natasha Fatah, "an escape that starts anywhere in the world but always ends in Canada". The interviewee is introduced by Fatah, who briefly outlines the refugee's story and allows them to tell it. The refugee's story is interspersed by clarifying comments by Fatah to fill in gaps caused by omissions in the recorded story. Finally, once the refugee's interview is finished, Fatah makes concluding remarks and outlines the plot of next week's program.

Ten instalments of Promised Land aired between June and August 2010, with shows premiering Monday evenings at 7:30pm at each station's local time (8:00pm Newfoundland Time), repeating on Friday mornings at 9:30am (10:00am Newfoundland Time). The show was broadcast on Sirius Satellite Radio Channel 137 on Mondays at 6:30pm and 10:20pm Eastern Time (ET) and on Fridays at 8:30am and 12:30pm ET.

Production 
Promised Land was produced by CBC Radio One producers Natasha Fatah, Mark Ulster and Dagna Pielaszkiewicz. Fatah's own family escaped from Pakistan to move to Toronto in 2002. The 10-part documentary series was released in CD format for sale online, although all ten episodes are available to download as a podcast from iTunes or the CBC web site. Fatah, the presenter and interviewer, claims to have had to stop recording her interviews on a couple of occasions because she had started crying in response to her interviewees' stories.

Episodes

Reception 
Despite receiving few reviews, Promised Land was well received by critics. Elisabeth Mahoney from The Guardian praised the show, writing, "[The interviews] make gripping radio. These well-produced half-hour shows are driven by stories that cannot help but be dramatic, and are assembled to heighten that using archive news clips, music (especially for the most terrifying moments of the escape) and, most crucially, voice."

References 

Canadian talk radio programs
CBC Radio One programs
Canadian documentary radio programs